Stictoleptura erythroptera is a species of longhorn beetle in the Lepturinae subfamily. It was described by Jacob Johann Hagenbach in 1822 and can be found in Central and Western Europe, (except for Portugal). The species can also be found in Eastern European countries like Bulgaria and Romania. It can also be found in Anatolia, the Caucasus and Iran.

Description
The species has reddish-brown wings and legs, with a black head. The life span is 2–3 years but may be longer.

Habitat
Adults fly from June–August. The species is polyphagous, feeding on various deciduous plants, including Aesculus hippocastanum, Fagus sylvatica and Quercus species. It lives in hollow trunks or thick branches of their host plant.

References

Stictoleptura
Beetles described in 1822
Beetles of Asia
Beetles of Europe